Anna Kravtchenko (born 1976) is an Italian classical pianist.

Early life
Kravtchenko began learning piano at age five; she recalls "the great joy of being able to construct a phrase in a certain way and discovering unique sounds".

Career 
In 1991, she won first prize at the international competition . A year later, at age 16, she won the Ferruccio Busoni International Piano Competition, which had not given its First Prize to any pianist for five years. She since had an international concert career, and recorded works by Frédéric Chopin and Franz Liszt for Decca.

Kravtchenko performed Rachmaninov's Rhapsody on a Theme of Paganini at the Berliner Philharmonie in 1994. In 1995, she toured Germany and Austria with the Israel Chamber Orchestra, playing Shostakovich's First Piano Concerto in Vienna in the hall of the Musikverein. In 2001, when she played Chopin's Piano Concerto in F minor with the Royal Liverpool Philharmonic Orchestra conducted by Walter Weller, Geoffrey Norris of The Telegraph said she played it "in a way that thoroughly warmed the heart and thrilled the senses", and explained:

Kravtchenko won the International Web Concert Hall Competition in 2006.

References

External links 

Cultura e spettacolo del Comune di Venezia
Fondazione Concorso Pianistico Internazionale Ferruccio Busoni
Universal Music

Living people
1976 births
Prize-winners of the Ferruccio Busoni International Piano Competition
Women classical pianists
People from Lugano
People from Imola
21st-century classical pianists
21st-century women pianists